The Wright F2W was an American racing aircraft built by Wright Aeronautical Corporation for the US Navy.

Development and design
The F2W was ordered by the US Navy to enter in the 1923 Pulitzer Trophy. Wright built the aircraft primarily of wood, covered in fabric, and was powered by the Wright T-3 Tornado engine. The first F2W flew for the first time on 2 August 1923.

Operational history
During the Pulitzer Race, the first F2W ran out of fuel and crashed. The second F2W, which carried twice as much fuel, finished third at 230.06 mph (370.25 km/h). It was later converted into a floatplane as the F2W-2 to take part in the 1924 Schneider Trophy race. During testing it was very unstable, and on its only flight, on 11 October 1924, crashed into the Delaware River at Philadelphia, Pennsylvania, when the tremendous torque of the Tornado engine flipped it onto its back while attempting to land. The pilot, badly injured, extricated himself from the wreckage.

Operators

United States Navy

Specifications

References

Notes

Bibliography
 

F2W
1920s United States sport aircraft
Single-engined tractor aircraft
Biplanes
Aircraft first flown in 1923